McLachlin is a surname. Notable people with the surname include:

Beth McLachlin (born 1950), American volleyball player and coach
Beverley McLachlin, PC (born 1943), the former Chief Justice of Canada, the first woman to hold that position
Daniel McLachlin (1810–1872), businessman and political figure in Canada West
Parker McLachlin (born 1979), American professional golfer

See also
MacLachlainn, the Scottish Gaelic form of the name.
List of Supreme Court of Canada cases (McLachlin Court) from the appointment of Beverley McLachlin as Chief Justice of Canada
Reasons of the Supreme Court of Canada by Chief Justice McLachlin

ru:Маклаклин